Moses Shabbethai Beer (died May 6, 1835) was an Italian rabbi. He was born in Pesaro, and he officiated as rabbi in Rome from December 1825. He was admitted to interviews with Popes Leo XII and Gregory XVI in 1827 and 1831, respectively, in order that he might plead on behalf of his community. This was the first time in the history of the Roman Jews that one of their representatives was permitted to appear in person before the pontiff.

Publications

References
 

1835 deaths
19th-century Italian rabbis
Chief rabbis of cities
People from Pesaro
Rabbis from Rome